Metal Priestess is the second extended play by American punk rock band Plasmatics. It was released on October 21, 1981 by Stiff Records and reissued the same year by PVC Records with an alternative cover.

Dan Hartman, who produced acts such as 38 Special and James Brown, among others, had been working on a session in LA when he picked up a copy of Beyond the Valley of 1984 and couldn't stop playing it. It was "ground breaking," he said. "I knew I wanted to meet these people and do something with them." Dan came down to the Tribeca loft where he met Wendy O. Williams and Rod Swenson and a month later he and Rod Swenson were working on the production of the Metal Priestess EP.

The creation of the EP is a result of the need to release something due to their increasing popularity, with an album being premature, partly because Capitol Records was now making overtures for the next one.  Metal Priestess was recorded at Dan's private studio off his schoolhouse turned home and studio in Connecticut and released early in the fall of 1981.

In 2002, the EP was re-released through Plasmatics Media, LTD on the New Hope for the Wretched re-release.

Track listing

Personnel 
Credits adapted from the album's liner notes.

Plasmatics
 Wendy O. Williams – vocals
 Richie Stotts – lead guitar
 Wes Beech – rhythm guitar
 Chris Romanelli – bass guitar
 Joey Reese – drums
 Jean Beauvoir – bass guitar, keyboards (on "Sex Junkie" and "Masterplan")
 Tony Petri – drums (on "Sex Junkie" and "Masterplan")

Production
 Dan Hartman – producer, engineer
 Rod Swenson – producer, concept, management
 Eddie Ciletti – engineer (on "Sex Junkie" and "Masterplan")
 Ted Jensen – mastering

Packaging
 Rod Swenson – photography (as Butch Star)
 Leslie Cabarga – cover art

References

External links 
 [ Metal Priestess] at AllMusic
 [ New Hope for the Wretched / Metal Priestess] at AllMusic
 

1981 EPs
Plasmatics albums
Stiff Records EPs